Gerould S. Wilhelm (born 1948) is an American botanist and lichenologist. He is known as author of several floras of the Chicago Region and the development of the Floristic Quality Assessment methodology, a tool to assess the integrity of natural areas. He is the director of research at Conservation Research Institute, a nonprofit organization "dedicated to the promotion of planning, design, restoration, and long-term management of sustainable ecological systems in built and natural environments through applied research, education, and outreach."

Selected publications

References

American lichenologists
1948 births
Botanists active in North America
20th-century American botanists
21st-century American botanists
Living people
Florida State University alumni
Southern Illinois University Carbondale alumni